Abderrahim Zouari (born 18 April 1944) is a Tunisian politician. He was the Minister of Transport from 2004 to 2011 under President Zine El Abidine Ben Ali. He was the candidate for the Destourian Movement in the 2014 presidential election. In January 2019, Zouari formed a party named Tahya Tounes.

Biography
From 1974 to 1978, he served as Governor of Gabès, then Governor of Nabeul. In 1991, he was appointed as Minister of Justice. From 1992 to 1993, he served as the Tunisian ambassador to Morocco. He was appointed as Foreign Minister in 1997, then as Education Minister in 1999. He also served as Secretary-General of the Constitutional Democratic Rally. In 2001, he was appointed as Minister of Youth and Sports, as well as Tourism and Handicrafts. In 2004, he was appointed as Minister of Transport, remaining in that post until he was dismissed in the aftermath of the Tunisian Revolution.

References

Living people
Ambassadors of Tunisia to Morocco
1944 births
Foreign ministers of Tunisia
People from Dahmani
Justice ministers of Tunisia